SM U-123 was one of the 329 submarines serving in the Imperial German Navy in World War I. 
U-123 was engaged in the naval warfare and took part in the First Battle of the Atlantic.

U-123 was surrendered to the Allies at Harwich on 22 November 1918 in accordance with the requirements of the Armistice with Germany. Initially earmarked for experiments, she was laid up at Portsmouth until towed out into the middle of the English Channel and scuttled on 28 June 1921.

Design
German Type UE II submarines were preceded by the shorter Type UE I submarines. U-123 had a displacement of  when at the surface and  while submerged. The submarine was powered by two  engines for use while surfaced, and two  engines for use while submerged. She had two shafts and two  propellers.

U-123 was fitted with four  torpedo tubes (fitted at the bow), twelve torpedoes, two  mine chutes (fitted at the stern), forty-two mines,  two  SK L/45 deck guns, and 600 rounds. She had a complement of forty (thirty-six crew members and four officers).

References

Notes

Citations

Bibliography

World War I submarines of Germany
Ships built in Hamburg
1918 ships
U-boats commissioned in 1918
U-boats sunk in 1921
German Type UE II submarines